"On the Road Again" is a song written and recorded by American country music singer Willie Nelson.

The song, about life on tour, came about when the executive producer of the film Honeysuckle Rose approached Nelson about writing the song for the film's soundtrack. "On the Road Again" became Nelson's 9th Country & Western No. 1 hit overall (6th as a solo recording act) in November 1980, and became one of Nelson's most recognizable tunes. In addition, the song reached No. 20 on the Billboard Hot 100, and No. 7 on the Adult Contemporary chart. It was his biggest pop hit to that time and won him a Grammy Award for Best Country Song a year later.

Background and writing
In 1980 Nelson starred in his first leading role in the Jerry Schatzberg film Honeysuckle Rose, about an aging musician who fails to achieve national fame and his relationship with his family, who also are part of his band that travels throughout the United States while playing in different venues. Shortly after signing the contract, Nelson was approached during a flight by Schatzberg and the executive producer of the movie, who requested him to write a song about life on the road to use as the theme song. Nelson quickly wrote the song on a barf bag. The tune featured a "train beat".

Release and reception
The song was released with Nelson's 1980 album Honeysuckle Rose, reaching the first position on Billboard's top country albums, while it ranked twenty on the Billboard Hot 100. Nelson received a Grammy Award for Best Country Song, while he was nominated for Best Original Song during the 53rd Academy Awards. In 2004, Rolling Stone ranked it No. 471 on its list of the 500 Greatest Songs of All Time. In 2011, "On the Road Again" was inducted to the Grammy Hall of Fame.

Legacy
Conan O'Brien performed the song as "My Own Show Again" during his 2010 Legally Prohibited from Being Funny on Television Tour, changing the lyrics to reflect how he could not wait to return to hosting a television series after leaving The Tonight Show earlier in the year.
"Forever Country", a promotional single released in 2016, features the song as a medley with "I Will Always Love You" and "Take Me Home, Country Roads".
First Aid Kit released a cover of "On the Road Again" as a single in 2020. Proceeds from the song sales were donated to Crew Nation in order to support the members of crew who were forced off the road and out of work due to the COVID-19 pandemic.

Charts

See also
Whitburn, Joel, Top Country Songs: 1944–2005, 2006.
Whitburn, Joel, Top Pop Singles: 1955–2006, 2007.

Footnotes

References

Songs about roads
1980 singles
2007 singles
Willie Nelson songs
Songs written for films
Songs written by Willie Nelson
Columbia Nashville Records singles
1980 songs